The former bishopric of Mâcon was located in Burgundy. The bishopric of Macon was established as a  suffragan of Lyon. The existence of Mâcon as a separate diocese ended at the French Revolution.

History
The city of Mâcon, formerly the capital of the Mâconnais, now of the Department of Saône-et-Loire, became a civitas (Celtic tribal 'city state') in the 5th century, when it was separated from the Æduan territory. Christianity appears to have been introduced from Lugdunum (present Lyon) into this city at an early period, and Hugh, Archbishop of Lyon, in the eleventh century, would call Mâcon "the eldest daughter of the Church of Lyon".

The bishopric, however, came into existence somewhat later than might have been expected: in the latter part of the 5th century it was still a Bishop of Lyon who brought relief to the famine-stricken people of Mâcon. At the end of that same century Merovingian king Clovis's occupation of the city both foreshadowed the gradual establishment of Frankish supremacy, accompanied by a decline in Arianism in the see. Duchesne thinks that the bishopric of Mâcon, suffragan of Lyon, may have originated in an understanding between the Merovingian princes after the suppression of the Burgundian kingdom.

The first bishop historically known is Placidus (538–555). The authentic list of his successors, as reconstructed by Duchesne, comprises several bishops venerated as saints: St. Florentinus (c. 561); St. Cælodonius, who assisted at the Council of Lyon in 570; St. Eusebius, who assisted at two councils, in 581 and 585. Tradition adds to this list the names of St. Salvinius, St. Nicetius (St. Nizier), and St. Justus, as bishops of Mâcon in the course of the sixth century. Among other bishops of later date may be mentioned St. Gerard (886–926), who died in a hermitage at Brou near Bourg-en-Bresse, and Cardinal Philibert Hugonet (1473–1484).

For many centuries the bishops seem to have been the only rulers of Mâcon; the city had no counts until after 850. From 926 the countship became hereditary. The Mâconnais was sold to king St. Louis in 1239 by Alice of Vienne, daughter of the last count, and her husband, Jean de Braine. In 1435 Charles VII of France, by the Treaty of Arras, ceded it to Philip, Duke of Burgundy, but in 1477 it reverted to France, upon the death of duke Charles the Bold. Emperor Charles V definitively recognized the Mâconnais as French at the Treaty of Cambrai in 1529.

The wars of religion filled Mâcon with blood; it was captured on 5 May 1562, by the Protestant Charles Balzac d'Entragues, on 18 August 1562, by the Catholic Tavannes, on 29 September 1567, it again fell into the hands of the Protestants, and on 4 December 1567, was recovered by the Catholics. But the Protestants of Mâcon were saved from the Massacre of St. Bartholomew, probably by the passive resistance with which the bailiff, Philibert de Laguiche, met the orders of king Charles IX of France. Odet de Coligny, known as Cardinal de Châtillon, who eventually became a Protestant and went to London to marry under the name of Comte de Beauvais, was from 1554 to 1560 prior, and after 1560 provost, of St-Pierre de Mâcon.

The Benedictine Abbey of Cluny, situated within the territory of this diocese, was exempted from its jurisdiction in the eleventh century, in spite of the opposition of Bishop Drogo. There is stilt preserved in the archives of the city a copy of the cartulary of the cathedral church of St-Vincent, rebuilt in the 13th century, but destroyed in 1793.

The existence of Mâcon as a separate diocese ended at the French Revolution, and the title of Mâcon is since borne by the Bishop of Autun.

Councils of Mâcon
Of the six councils held at Mâcon (579, 581–or 582–585, 624, 906, 1286), the second and third, convoked by command of King Gontran, are worthy of special mention.

The second council, in 581 or 582, which assembled six metropolitans and fifteen bishops, enacted penalties against luxury among the clergy, against clerics who summoned other clerics before lay tribunals, and against religious who married; it also regulated the relations of Christians with Jews.

The third council, in 585, at which 43 bishops and the representatives of 20 other bishops assisted, tried the bishops accused of having taken part in the revolt of Gondebaud, fixed the penalties for violating the Sunday rest, insisted on the obligation of paying tithes, established the right of the bishop to interfere in the courts when widows and orphans were concerned, determined the relative precedence of clerics and laymen, and decreed that every three years a national synod should be convoked by the Bishop of Lyon and the king.

Known Bishops
 538-555 : Saint Placide of Mâcon
 560 : Saint Salvin of Mâcon
 567 : Saint Célidaine
 ~575 : Saint Nizier
 ~580 : Saint Just
 581-585 : Saint Eusèbe
 ~590 : Saint Florentin of Mâcon
 599-612 : Déce
 ~612 : Mummole
 615-650 : Dieudonné
 ~657 : Aganon
 Déce II
 743 : Dumnole
 801 : Lédouard
 813 : Gondulphe
 814-850 : Hildebaud
 853-862 : Bredincus of Mâcon
 864-873 : Bernoud
 875-878 : Lambert
 879-885 : Gontard
 886-926 : Saint Gérard de Mâcon
 926 : Adalran
 927-936 : Bernon
 938-958 : Maimbode
 960-962 : Théotelin
 963-973 : Adon
 974-977 : Jean
 ~979 : Eudes
 981-991 : Milon

Middle Ages
 993-1018 : Liébaud de Brancion
 1019-1030 : Gauslin, Bishop of Mâcon
 1031-1050 : Gauthier de Brancion
 1059-1073 : Drogon
 1073-1096 : Landry de Berzé
 1097-1123 : Bérard de Châtillon ou Bernard
 1124-1140 : Jocerand de Baisenens
 1140-1161 : Ponce de Thoire
 1164-1184 : Étienne de Bâgé
 1185-1197 : Renaud de Vergny
 1202-1219 : Ponce de Rochebaron
 1221-1241 : Aymon
 1242-1262 : Seguin de Lugny
 1262-1264 : Jean de Damas
 1264-1276 : Guichard de Germolles
 1277-1284 : Pierre de La Jaisse
 1284-1295 : Hugues de Fontaines
 1296-1316 : Nicolas de Bar
 1317-1358 : Jean de Salagny
 1363-1380 : Philippe de Sainte-Croix
 1382-1389 : Jean de Boissy
 1389-1397 : Thiébaud de Rougemont
 1398-1411 : Pierre de Juys
 1412-1417 : Jean Christini
 1418-1430 : Geoffroy de Saint-Amour
 1431-1433 : Jean Le Jeune
 Jean de Macet
 1434-1448 et 1449-1473 : Étienne Hugonet
 1473-1484 : Philibert Hugonet, cardinal.
 1485-1510 : Étienne de Longvy
 1510-1529 : Claude de Longwy de Givry
 1529-1531 : François-Louis Chantereau
 1531-1539 : Charles de Hémard de Denonville, cardinal
 1541-1542 : Antoine de Narbonne
 1542-1545 : François de Faucon
 1544-1551 : Pierre du Châtel
 1552-1554 : François de Faucon
 1557-1559 : Amanieu de Foix
 1559-1582 : Jean-Baptiste l'Alamanni
 1583-1599 : Luc Alamanni
 1599-1619 : Gaspard Dinet
 1620-1650 : Louis Dinet
 1651-1665 : Jean de Lingendes
 1665-1666 : Guillaume Le Boux
 1666-1676 : Michel Colbert de Saint-Pouange
 1677-1682 : Michel Cassagnet de Tilladet (bishop of Clermont)
 1682-1684 : Claude II de Saint-Georges
 1684-1731 : Michel Cassagnet de Tilladet
 1732-1763 : Henri-Constance de Lort de Sérignan de Valras
 1763-1790 : Gabriel François Moreau.

See also
 Catholic Church in France
 List of Catholic dioceses in France

References

Bibliography

Reference works
  (Use with caution; obsolete)
  (in Latin) 
 (in Latin)

Studies

Attribution

Macon
Macon, Diocese
History of Burgundy